Darío Sebastián Leguiza (born 23 February 1993) is an Argentine professional footballer who plays as a defender.

Career
Leguiza made his breakthrough into senior football with Platense. He made his professional bow in a home defeat to Almirante Brown on 17 February 2015, which was followed by ten further appearances in the 2015 Primera B Metropolitana; he had initially been an unused substitute in the Copa Argentina in 2014. Leguiza scored his first goal during his thirty-fifth appearance in May 2017, netting the only goal in a victory over Atlanta at the Estadio Ciudad de Vicente López. Platense won promotion in 2017–18 but Leguiza didn't feature competitively; though subsequently made his Primera B Nacional bow in August 2018 in a home loss versus Mitre.

Leguiza spent the 2019–20 campaign in Primera B Metropolitana with Fénix.

Career statistics
.

References

External links

1993 births
Living people
Footballers from Buenos Aires
Argentine footballers
Association football defenders
Primera B Metropolitana players
Primera Nacional players
Club Atlético Platense footballers
Club Atlético Fénix players